Gemini 2 (Gemini-Titan 2; GT-2) was the second spaceflight of the American human spaceflight program Project Gemini, and was launched and recovered on January 19, 1965. Gemini 2, like Gemini 1, was an uncrewed mission intended as a test flight of the Gemini spacecraft. Unlike Gemini 1, which was placed into orbit, Gemini 2 made a suborbital flight, primarily intended to test the spacecraft's heat shield. It was launched on a Titan II GLV rocket. The spacecraft used for the Gemini 2 mission was later refurbished into the Gemini B configuration, and was subsequently launched on another suborbital flight, along with OPS 0855, as a test for the US Air Force Manned Orbital Laboratory. Gemini spacecraft no. 2 was the first craft to make more than one spaceflight since the X-15, and the only one until Space Shuttle Columbia flew its second mission in 1981; it would also be the only space capsule to be reused until Crew Dragon Endeavour was launched a second time in 2021.

Mission history

GLV
The Titan II/Gemini launch vehicle was dismantled to protect it from two hurricanes in August and September 1964. The second stage of the vehicle was taken down and stored in a hangar on August 26, 1964, in preparation for Hurricane Cleo, and the entire launch vehicle was subsequently dismantled and removed from Cape Kennedy Air Force Station's Launch Complex 19 in early September before Hurricane Dora passed over Cape Kennedy on September 9. The Gemini launch vehicle was erected for the final time on 12 September 1964.

Many ground tests were carried out on the Gemini 2 and Titan rocket in November 1964. On November 24, Gemini-Titan (GT) 2 successfully completed the Wet Mock Simulated Launch, a full-scale countdown exercise which included propellant loading. Procedures for flight crew suiting and spacecraft ingress and egress were practiced during simulated launch. The prime flight crew for Gemini 3 donned pressure suits and full biomedical instrumentation, assisted by their backup crew and the space suit bioinstrumentation and aeromedical personnel who would participate in the GT-3 launch operation. As a result of this practice operation, it was established that all physical examinations, bioinstrumentation sensor attachment, and suit donning would be done in the pilot ready room at Launch Complex 16.

Gemini 2 had been scheduled for launch on December 9, 1964. On that date, the countdown reached zero and the first stage engines were ignited. The launch vehicle's Malfunction Detection System detected technical problems due to a loss of hydraulic pressure and shut down the engines about one second after ignition.

On the second launch attempt on January 19, 1965, Gemini 2 lifted off from Launch Complex 19 at Cape Kennedy at 9:03:59 a.m. EST (14:03:59.861 UTC).

Shortly after launch the Mission Control Center suffered a power outage.  Control of the mission was transferred to a tracking ship.  The outage was later traced to an overload of the electrical system from the network television equipment used to cover the launch.

The spacecraft was run by an onboard automatic sequencer. At 6 minutes 54 seconds after launch, retrorockets were fired. The spacecraft landed  downrange from the launch pad. The flight lasted 18 minutes 16 seconds. The spacecraft was brought aboard the carrier at 15:52 UT (10:52 a.m. EST). Most goals were achieved, except the fuel cells had failed before liftoff and were turned off. The spacecraft cooling system temperature also was found to be too high. The Gemini 2 spacecraft was in excellent condition. Its heat shield and retrorockets functioned as expected. The Gemini 2 mission was supported by 6,562 United States Department of Defense personnel, 67 aircraft, and 16 ships.

Gemini 2 had flight instrumentation pallets installed in the crew cabin, similar to those in Gemini 1.

MOL
The Gemini 2 reentry module was refurbished and flown again on November 3, 1966, in a test flight for the United States Air Force Manned Orbiting Laboratory program. It was launched on a Titan IIIC rocket on a 33-minute suborbital flight from LC-40 at Cape Kennedy. It is the only Gemini spacecraft to have flown with U.S. Air Force insignia, but there is an unflown Gemini B spacecraft in USAF markings on display at the National Museum of the United States Air Force at Wright-Patterson Air Force Base in Dayton, Ohio.

Gallery

See also
Gemini program
Manned Orbiting Laboratory
Titan (rocket family)
Titan III
List of NASA missions
Splashdown (spacecraft landing)

References

External links

Manned Space Flight Network Performance Analysis for the GT-2 Mission - NASA - May 14, 1965 (PDF)
NASA Gemini 2 press kit - December 4. 1964
 presentation on the Gemini 2 and the Manned Orbital Laboratory spacecraft on display at the Air Force Space and Missile Museum

Project Gemini missions
1965 in spaceflight
Spacecraft launched by Titan rockets
Spacecraft which reentered in 1965
January 1965 events